Aiken High School is a public high school located in Cincinnati, Ohio. The school, which opened in 1962, is part of Cincinnati Public Schools. Aiken houses two programs: Aiken College & Career High School and Aiken University High School.

Starting with the 1995–1996 school year, the school began a pilot program for Cincinnati Public Schools that keeps student classes together from grade 9 to grade 10. Teachers reported higher retention of ninth-grade students.

History

Background 
Aiken high school was founded in 1962 and is one of the several Cincinnati public high schools. The schools culture has changed severely overtime from the early sixties through the eighties. Aiken was a predominantly white school, however, looking at present day demographics, the school is highly diverse. Aiken once housed two educational programs 'Aiken College and Career high school' and 'Aiken University high school', students had the option to learn a trade program such as cosmetology, welding, nursing, and more. Since the school was rebuilt and opened in 2014 in College Hill it is now known as 'Aiken New Tech High School'- focusing primarily on technological skills as technology continues to advance in children's lives. Aiken high school serves children grades 7-12 of multiple ethnicity, disabilities, and backgrounds.

In 2014 along with rebuilding the school, its culture, and its overall name Aiken became partners with New Tech, a partnership that promotes the idea of project based learning, better known as (PBL), project based learning is used in order to encourage self-regulation in students. Project based learning focuses on five overall areas

 Agency
 Oral Communication
 Collaboration
 Written Communication
 Knowledge and thinking skills

Notable alumni

 Chane Behanan, professional basketball player, played for University of Louisville (moved to Bowling Green, Kentucky after sophomore year)
 Dixon Edwards, NFL linebacker
 Jim O'Brien, NFL placekicker for Super Bowl V champion Baltimore Colts
 Ike Reese, NFL linebacker
 Scott Service, MLB player (Philadelphia Phillies, Montreal Expos, Cincinnati Reds, Colorado Rockies, San Francisco Giants, Kansas City Royals, Oakland Athletics, Arizona Diamondbacks, Toronto Blue Jays)
 Shane Sparks, hip -op choreographer

See also 
List of high schools in Ohio

References

External links
Aiken High School
Cincinnati Public Schools

Cincinnati Public Schools
High schools in Hamilton County, Ohio
Educational institutions established in 1962
Public high schools in Ohio
1962 establishments in Ohio